Tour First (previously known as Tour UAP between 1974 and 1998, and as Tour Axa between 1998 and 2007) is an office skyscraper in Courbevoie, in La Défense, the business district of the Paris metropolitan area.

The tower was built in 1974 by Bouygues for the UAP insurance company. Its ground shape was in the form of a three-pointed star whose branches were separated each by a 120° angle. This particular shape was chosen to symbolize the merger of the three French insurance companies that were at the origin of UAP. The tower was renamed Tour Axa when UAP was bought by the Axa insurance company in 1996.

Large-scale renovation of the tower began in 2007 and was completed in 2011. The exterior appearance of the building was completely changed, with extra height added to the tower. It is currently the tallest skyscraper in France, only surpassed in height by the Eiffel Tower.

See also 
 La Défense
 List of tallest buildings and structures in the Paris region
 List of tallest buildings in France

References

External links 
 Tour First (Insecula)

First
La Défense
Office buildings completed in 1974
Kohn Pedersen Fox buildings
Office buildings completed in 2011
21st-century architecture in France